Richard Statman (born September 6, 1946) is an American computer scientist whose principal research interest is the theory of computation, especially symbolic computation. His research involves lambda calculus, type theory, and combinatory algebra.

Career
In 1974, Statman received his Ph.D. from Stanford University for his Ph.D. dissertation, supervised by Georg Kreisel, entitled Structural Complexity of Proofs. His achievements include the proof that the type inhabitation problem in simply typed lambda calculus is PSPACE-complete.

External links
Carnegie Mellon profile

American computer scientists
Living people
1946 births